Epitaph is a 2015 Mexican adventure historical drama film directed by Rubén Imaz and Yulene Olaizola. The film was named on the shortlist for Mexico's entry for the Academy Award for Best Foreign Language Film at the 89th Academy Awards.

Cast
 Xabier Coronado as Diego de Ordaz
 Martín Román as Gonzalo de Monovar
 Carlos Triviño as Pedrito

References

External links
 

2015 films
Mexican adventure drama films
Mexican historical drama films
2010s Spanish-language films
2010s Mexican films

2015 drama films